The B4E Business for the Environment Summit (commonly abbreviated as B4E or B4E Summit) is an international platform for dialogue and partnership for the environment.

The acceleration and delivery of such transformative solutions will require a higher level of collaboration between businesses, governments, and non-government organizations (NGOs). B4E aims to facilitate such collaboration through networking, informed discussions, and the creation of innovative partnerships for change.

Issues addressed at these summits include energy, natural resource security, climate change, water management and biodiversity conservation, among others.

Past speakers at previous Summits include international luminaries like Ban Ki-moon, Al Gore, Helen Clark, and Göran Persson, the current Presidents of South Korea, Indonesia and Guyana, business leaders such as Nam Yong, Ben Verwaayen, Jochen Zeitz, Sir Richard Branson, Barbara Kux and renowned experts like David Suzuki, Janine Benyus and Amory Lovins representing civil society. The Summits also involve international NGOs and agencies like WWF, Greenpeace, the Rocky Mountain Institute, the World Food Programme, and UNDP in their inclusive dialogues.

Official outcome declarations from the Summit discussions reflect commitments from stakeholders on the need to embrace innovative solutions for environmental issues and are used to provide input to the UN Climate Change Conferences and Rio+.

History 
Past B4E Summits were convened for the last five years in Singapore, Paris, Copenhagen during the COP 15, Seoul, Mexico City, Cancún during the COP 16 and Jakarta in partnership with the United Nations, WWF, Global Initiatives and host Governments where the summits took place.

B4E Global Summit 2007 & 2008 Singapore 
The first and second B4E Summits were held in Singapore. The guest of honour at the event was Singapore's then-Minister for National Development, Mah Bow Tan, and distinguished speakers included Achim Steiner, Georg Kell, David Suzuki, H.E. Maumoon Abdul Gayoom, Adam Werbach and Zhang Yue.

B4E Global Summit 2009 Paris 
Titled “The Green Imperative: Leadership, Innovation and Technology”, B4E Global Summit 2009 took place in Paris, France.
Notable speakers at the 2009 summit included Joseph Alcamo, Pavan Sukdev and H.R.H. Prince El Hassan bin Talal, as well as repeated appearances by Achim Steiner and Georg Kell.

B4E Global Summit 2010 Seoul 
The B4E Global Summit returned to the Asian continent in 2010, and was held in Seoul, Republic of Korea. With addresses and presentations from Lee Myung-bak, Al Gore, Ban Ki-moon, James Leape and numerous other dignitaries, international attention from the media, policy makers and industry was drawn to the event.

B4E Climate Summit 2010 Cancún 
The Climate Summit at Cancún saw a greater and growing partnership between the Summit and international organisations such as WWF and various UN agencies.  The outcome statements were favourably viewed upon by industry and non-governmental observers as a feasible avenue for business, government and civil society to gather and discuss business-led targets and solutions for climate change.

B4E Global Summit 2011 Jakarta 
Recently concluded in Jakarta, Indonesia, the Global Summit in 2011 took ownership of its location in Jakarta to shift focus to forestry and agriculture, in conjunction with the UN International Year of Forests. A steering committee of business, governmental and civil representatives was formed and gathered first in January to engineer focused discussion panels for the actual Summit in April. The Jakarta Summit included notable speakers such as Susilo Bambang Yudhoyono, Helen Clark and Andrew Steer.

The summit once again featured a recurring Youth Dialogue component to encourage students to engage in local environmental projects, with a separate workshop conducted by National Geographic wildlife presenter Hayden Turner.

References 

Climate change conferences
Environmental conferences